Hari Dev Shourie (1911–2005) was a well-known consumer activist in India.

Biography
Hari Dev Shourie was born in Lahore in British India in 1911. He has also served in the Indian Civil Services. He served as Director General at the Indian Institute of Foreign Trade. He founded Common Cause in India) in 1980, a New Delhi based NGO. He also edited the journal published by Common Cause on consumer rights, named "Common Cause", which he started even before Indian people were aware of the concept of Consumer rights. He fought a number of Public Interest Litigations, many of which resulted in Landmark Judgments by the Supreme Court of India. Common Cause (India) has helped lakhs of people in getting justice — for example getting their pensions etc. The Government of India awarded him the Padma Bhushan and the Padma Vibhushan, the third and the second highest civilian awards. He was also named on People of the Year by the Limca Book of Records.

Common Cause has worked towards probity in public life and integrity of institutions and is dedicated to championing public causes. Common Cause has worked on issues like the 2G spectrum case, Indian coal allocation scam, Advance healthcare directive, appointment of Lokpal, banning of Professional Blood Donation, etc.

Family
His son is Arun Shourie, former Minister for Communications, IT and Disinvestment and one of India's best known journalists.
Another son is Deepak Shourie, managing director, Discovery Communications India. 
Nalini Singh, TV journalist-anchor and managing director, TV Live India Pvt Ltd.is his daughter.

References

External links

1911 births
2005 deaths
Indian human rights activists
Consumer rights activists
Consumer protection in India
Recipients of the Padma Bhushan in social work